The 1933 Detroit Titans football team represented the University of Detroit in the 1933 college football season. Detroit shut out six of eight opponents, outscored all opponents by a combined total of 157 to 20, and finished with a 7–1 record in its ninth year under head coach and College Football Hall of Fame inductee, Gus Dorais. Significant games included victories over Marquette (22–6), Holy Cross (24–0), and Michigan State (14–0), and a loss to Duquesne (14–0).

Schedule

References

External links
 1933 University of Detroit football programs

Detroit
Detroit Titans football seasons
Detroit Titans football
Detroit Titans football